Fontvieille is the southernmost ward in the Principality of Monaco. It was developed by an Italian architect, Manfredi Nicoletti, between the 1970s and the 1990s.

History 
In contrast to the other city districts Monaco-Ville, Monte Carlo and La Condamine, Fontvieille was constructed, after Italian engineer Gianfranco Gilardini's design, almost entirely on artificially reclaimed land and thus represents one of the younger parts of the principality. In order to combat the chronic land shortage in the extremely densely populated principality, the work was begun in 1966 to create new land in the Mediterranean Sea southwest of le rocher. In 1981, Albert II, then Crown Prince, laid the cornerstone for the new city quarter.

The existence of Fontvieille, and its many public works projects, relates substantially to former Prince of Monaco, Prince Rainier III's reputation as the Builder Prince.

Plans announced in late 2009 to extend Fontvieille by the Department of Urban Development are currently being overseen by Prince Albert. The plan is to build a small 0.05 km2 (0.02 sq mi) or 5.3 ha (13 acres) aura on the west side of the rock, currently planned to be finished by 2015.

The new area will include three to four new hotels, corporate businesses, shops and apartments for between 600 and 800 newcomers.

Despite not being the highest-priced part of Monaco, flats are also very expensive. For example, a 65 m2 (700 ft²) one bedroom apartment with one bathroom and one car parking space was offered at €3,200,000 (about $3,514,000 US) in May 2015.

Geography 
It accommodates 3,602.

Four hectares (9.9 acres) of Fontvieille are given over to the Fontvieille Park and Princess Grace Rose Garden.

Part of Fontvieille's southern boundaries include the border with the French Republic where the Didier Deschamps Stadium and the Port of Cap d'Ail are located in close proximity.

Sport 
Fontvieille contains Stade Louis II (or Louis II Stadium), which serves as the home ground of AS Monaco FC, a Monaco football club that is one of the most successful in the French national league.

It also contains a small indoor sports arena called Salle Gaston Médecin where AS Monaco Basket what plays in LNB Pro A, and hosts other events like handball, volleyball, gymnastics, and more.

Monaco's only racing team, ROKiT Venturi Racing – which competes in the FIA Formula E World Championship – is also based in Fontvieille.

Landmarks 
The district also contains the Monaco Heliport, which provides frequent links to Nice Airport in neighboring France, with connections to direct flights to New York, Dubai, London, and other important European destinations.

Monaco's automobile museum, the Monaco Top Cars Collection, is located on the Terrasses de Fontvieille.

The Museum of Stamps and Coins displays Monegasque money dating to 1640, and illustrates the postal history of the principality.

Columbus Hotel Monaco, which was owned by former racing driver David Coulthard, is located in Fontvieille.

Venturi and its subsidiary Voxan are headquartered on the northern side of Fontvieille.

Gallery

Notable residents 

 David and Frederick Barclay, English entrepreneurs
 Ken Bates, English hotelier
 Björn Borg, Swedish professional tennis player
 David Coulthard, Scottish racing driver
 Nicolas Ioannou, Cypriot businessman
 Firoz Kassam, Tanzanian entrepreneur
 Ken McCulloch, English hotelier
 Max Verstappen, Dutch racing driver

See also 
 Land reclamation in Monaco
 Municipality of Monaco

References

External links 

 Fontvieille, Monaco

 
1980s establishments in Monaco
1981 establishments in Europe
France–Monaco border crossings
Land reclamation
Populated places established in 1981
Quarters of Monaco